The following is a list of individuals associated with women's colleges in the United States through attending as a student or graduating.

Activists
 Marian Wright Edelman, graduate of Spelman College; activist for the rights of children; president and founder of the Children's Defense Fund
 Betty Friedan, 1942 graduate of Smith College; author and noted feminist
 Sally Miller Gearhart, 1952 graduate of Sweet Briar College; feminist, science fiction author and activist
 Gloria Johnson-Powell, graduate of Mount Holyoke College; important figure in the American Civil Rights Movement; one of the first African American woman to attain tenure at Harvard Medical School
 Gloria Steinem, 1956 graduate of Smith College
 Silda Wall Spitzer, 1980 graduate of Meredith College; founder and chair of the board of community/volunteering group Children for Children

Authors, journalists, and poets
 Margaret Atwood, graduate of Radcliffe College; author
 Katharine Lee Bates, graduate of Wellesley College; best known for writing "America the Beautiful"
 Elizabeth Bishop, graduate of Vassar College; Poet Laureate of the United States, 1949-1950; Pulitzer Prize winner in 1956
 Madeleine Blais, 1969 graduate of the College of New Rochelle; Pulitzer Prize-winning journalist and author
 Margaret Wise Brown, 1932 graduate of Hollins University; author of Goodnight Moon
 Pearl Sydenstricker Buck, 1914 graduate of Randolph-Macon Woman's College; author of The Good Earth; first woman to win both the Nobel and Pulitzer Prizes
 Elizabeth Campbell, 1923 graduate of Salem College; first woman founder of a PBS station
 Pearl Cleage, graduate of Spelman College; author
 Ann Compton, graduate of Hollins University; news reporter for ABC; inductee of the Radio Hall of Fame
 Candy Crowley, 1970 graduate of Randolph-Macon Woman's College; former CNN senior political correspondent; recipient of awards for outstanding journalism from the National Press Foundation and the Associated Press
 Kiran Desai, graduate of Hollins University; author; recipient of the Man Booker Prize in 2006
 Emily Dickinson, attended Mount Holyoke College (then "Mount Holyoke Female Seminary"); poet
 Annie Dillard, 1967 graduate of Hollins University; Pulitzer Prize–winning author of Pilgrim at Tinker Creek
 Nora Ephron, graduate of Wellesley College; author
 Lendon Gray, 1971 graduate of Sweet Briar College; author and winner of multiple Olympic medals in dressage
 H.D., attended Bryn Mawr College; modernist poet
 Molly Haskell, 1961 graduate of Sweet Briar College; author and film critic
 Mary Davis Holt, graduate of Salem College; managing partner at Flynn Heath Holt Leadership; co-author of Break Your Own Rules: How to Change the Patterns of Thinking that Block Women's Paths to Power; executive coach; held leadership positions at Time Inc and Time Warner
 Zora Neale Hurston, 1928 graduate of Barnard College; author
 Gwen Ifill, 1977 graduate of Simmons College; moderator and managing editor of Washington Week in Review; moderator for both the 2004 and 2008 vice presidential debates
 Helen Keller, graduate of Radcliffe College; author, activist and lecturer; first deafblind person to graduate from college
 Jhumpa Lahiri, 1989 graduate of Barnard College; Pulitzer Prize-winning author
 Ursula K. Le Guin, graduate of Radcliffe College; author
 Marianne Moore, graduate of Bryn Mawr College; modernist poet
 Marsha Norman, graduate of Agnes Scott College; Pulitzer Prize winner for her drama 'night, Mother
 Flannery O'Connor, graduate of Georgia College & State University; author
 Suzan-Lori Parks, 1985 graduate of Mount Holyoke College; Pulitzer Prize-winning playwright
 Sylvia Plath, 1955 graduate of Smith College; author and poet
 Anna Quindlen, graduate of Barnard College; journalist with the New York Times
 Cokie Roberts, 1964 graduate of Wellesley College; contributing senior news analyst for National Public Radio; regular roundtable analyst for This Week with George Stephanopoulos
 Shaun Robinson, 1984 graduate of Spelman College; Access Hollywood correspondent
 Diane Sawyer, 1967 graduate of Wellesley College; television reporter for ABC and co-anchor of its morning news show, Good Morning America
 Mary Lee Settle, attended Sweet Briar College; author; a founder of the annual PEN/Faulkner Award for Fiction
 Lee Smith, 1967 graduate of Hollins University; author of The Last Girls
 Lesley Stahl, graduate of Wheaton College; reporter for 60 Minutes
 Gertrude Stein, graduate of Radcliffe College; modernist author and critic
 Ann Taylor, attended Sweet Briar College; newscaster for National Public Radio (NPR); contributor to All Things Considered since 1989
 Alice Walker, attended Spelman College and Sarah Lawrence College; Pulitzer Prize-winning author
 Barbara Walters, graduate of Sarah Lawrence College; journalist, writer, and media personality who has been a regular fixture on morning television shows (Today and The View), an evening news magazine (20/20), and on World News (then ABC Evening News)
 Wendy Wasserstein, 1971 graduate of Mount Holyoke College; Pulitzer Prize-winning playwright
 Eudora Welty, graduate of Mississippi University for Women; author
 Paula Zahn, graduate of Stephens College; reporter and/or anchor for various networks on numerous programs such as CBS This Morning, CBS Evening News, Good Morning America, The Edge with Paula Zahn, American Morning with Paula Zahn and Paula Zahn Now
 Ann M. Martin, 1977 graduate of Smith College; author
 Madeleine L'Engle, 1941 graduate of Smith College; author
 Molly Ivins, 1966 graduate of Smith College; author, journalist, and political commentator
 Jane Yolen, 1960 graduate of Smith College; author

College presidents
 Jo Allen, graduate of Meredith College; its current president
 Mary Brown Bullock, graduate of Agnes Scott College; its immediate past president
 Nancy Cantor, graduate of Sarah Lawrence College; former Chancellor of University of Illinois at Urbana–Champaign; President of Syracuse University
 Carol T. Christ, graduate of Douglass College (part of Rutgers University); current president of Smith College
 Alecia A. DeCoudreaux, graduate of Wellesley College; current president of Mills College
 Drew Gilpin Faust, graduate of Bryn Mawr College; first female president of Harvard University
 Elaine Tuttle Hansen, graduate of Mount Holyoke College; current president of Bates College
 Ada Howard, graduate of Mount Holyoke College; first president of Wellesley College
 Ruth Austin Knox, 1975 graduate of Wesleyan College; 24th president in of the college, in 2003
 Audrey F. Manley, graduate of Spelman College; its president, 1997–2002
 Susan Tolman Mills, graduate of Mount Holyoke College; co-founder and first president of Mills College
 Carol Ann Mooney, graduate of Saint Mary's College; president 2004–2016
 Nancy J. Vickers, graduate of Mount Holyoke College; president of Bryn Mawr College, 1997–2008
 Diana Chapman Walsh, graduate of Wellesley College; its president, 1993–2007

Computer science, engineering, science, social science
 Ruth Benedict, 1909 graduate of Vassar College; anthropologist
 Leah Busque, 2001 graduate of Sweet Briar College; founder and CEO of TaskRabbit
 Annie Jump Cannon, 1884 graduate of Wellesley College; astronomer who developed the well-known Henry Draper Catalogue of stars based upon temperature
 Rachel Carson, graduate of Chatham University; author of Silent Spring, the book which is credited with advancing the global environmental movement
 Marjorie Grene, 1931 graduate of Wellesley College; earned Ph.D. from Radcliffe College in 1935; internationally recognized as a major philosopher of biology
 Grace Hopper, 1928 graduate of Vassar College; computer scientist who developed the first compiler for a computer programming language
 Susan Kare, 1975 graduate of Mount Holyoke College; original designer of many of the interface elements for the original Apple Macintosh
 Stephanie Kwolek, 1946 graduate of Margaret Morrison Carnegie College; inventor of Kevlar
 Margaret Mead, 1923 graduate of Barnard College; anthropologist
 Pamela Melroy, 1983 graduate of Wellesley College; former NASA astronaut; pilot on Space Shuttle missions STS-92 and STS-112; commanded mission STS-120
 Jean E. Sammet, 1948 graduate of Mount Holyoke College; inventor of the FORMAC programming language
 Marshalyn Yeargin-Allsopp, 1968 graduate of Sweet Briar College; medical epidemiologist and chief of the developmental disabilities branch at the Centers for Disease Control and Prevention

Government officials
Stacey Abrams, 1995 graduate of Spelman College; first black woman major-party gubernatorial nominee in the United States
 Madeleine Albright, 1959 graduate of Wellesley College; first woman Secretary of State
 Tammy Baldwin, graduate of Smith College; first openly gay U.S. Senator
 Colleen Bell, graduate of Sweet Briar College; in 2015 became the US Ambassador to Hungary
 Mary McLeod Bethune, 1894 graduate of Scotia Seminary (now Barber-Scotia College); an adviser to President Franklin D. Roosevelt
 Benazir Bhutto, graduate of Radcliffe College; first woman elected to lead a Muslim state; Pakistan's first (and to date only) female prime minister, serving twice, 1988–1990 and 1993–1996
 Elaine Chao, 1975 graduate of Mount Holyoke College; Secretary of Labor and Secretary of Transportation; first Asian American woman to be appointed to the President's Cabinet
 Hillary Clinton, 1969 graduate of Wellesley College; former Secretary of State for Barack Obama; formerly the junior United States senator from New York; former First Lady of the United States (1993–2001)
 Ruth A. Davis, 1966 graduate of Spelman College; first woman of color to be appointed Director General of the Foreign Service; first African-American Director of the Foreign Service Institute
 Geraldine Ferraro, 1956 graduate of Marymount Manhattan College; first woman to represent a major U.S. political party as a candidate for Vice President, in 1984
 Gabby Giffords, 1993 graduate of Scripps College; represented Arizona's 8th Congressional district from 2007 until her resignation in 2012 due to the aftermath of an assassination attempt
 Katherine Harris, 1979 graduate of Agnes Scott College; former Florida Secretary of State and U.S. Representative
 Elizabeth P. Hoisington, 1940 graduate of the College of Notre Dame of Maryland; one of the first two women to be promoted to Brigadier General in the United States Army, at the time being Director of the Women's Army Corps; President Nixon announced her promotion in 1970
 Katherine G. Howard, attended Salem Academy and Salem College before graduating from Smith College; worked in the Eisenhower administration in the Federal Civil Defense Administration, as the U.S. delegate to the NATO committee on civil defense, and as Deputy U.S. Commissioner General to the Brussels World Fair
 Frank M. Hull, 1970 graduate of Randolph-Macon Woman's College; judge on the United States Court of Appeals for the Eleventh Circuit
 Jeane Jordan Kirkpatrick, graduate of Stephens College (then a two-year institution) and later Barnard College; first female U.S. Ambassador to the U.N.
 Blanche Lincoln, 1982 graduate of Randolph-Macon Woman's College; Democratic U.S. Senator from Arkansas, 1999–2011; previously served in the U.S. House of Representatives from Arkansas' 1st congressional district; at age 38, was the youngest woman to be elected to the Senate, in 1998
 Barbara Mikulski, 1958 graduate of Mount St. Agnes College, now part of Loyola College in Baltimore, Maryland; graduate of the Institute of Notre Dame; the senior woman in the United States Senate; Maryland's senior Senator
 Nancy Pelosi, 1962 graduate of Trinity College (now Trinity Washington University); graduate of the Institute of Notre Dame in Baltimore; first woman Speaker of the House
 Frances Perkins, 1902 graduate of Mount Holyoke College; first woman cabinet member (U.S. Secretary of Labor, 1933–1945, under Franklin D. Roosevelt)
 Susan Philips, 1967 graduate of Agnes Scott College; first woman to chair a financial regulatory agency (the Commodity Futures Trading Commission)
 Sarah Childress Polk, attended Salem Female Academy in 1817 (later became Salem College); wife of US President James K. Polk
 Emily J. Reynolds, 1978 graduate of Stephens College; Secretary of the United States Senate, 2003–2007; Senior Vice President for Government Relations with the Tennessee Valley Authority
 Virginia Shehee, graduate of Stephens College; first woman elected to the Louisiana State Senate (1975)
 Patsy Ticer, 1955 graduate of Sweet Briar College; member of the Virginia Senate, 1996–2012
 Teresa Tomlinson, 1987 graduate from Sweet Briar College; first woman to be elected mayor of Columbus, Georgia, in 2011; became the Chair of Sweet Briar's Board of Directors
 Susan Webber Wright, 1970 graduate of Randolph-Macon Woman's College; US district court judge in Little Rock, Arkansas; presided over Paula Jones's sexual harassment lawsuit against former President Bill Clinton; was involved with the investigation of the Whitewater scandal with Kenneth Starr

Performing artists, producers, composers and visual artists
 Elizabeth Bell, 1950 graduate of Wellesley College; composer
 Debra Martin Chase, graduate of Mount Holyoke College; Hollywood producer
 China Chow, 1996 graduate of Scripps College; actress
 Sofia Coppola, attended Mills College; director
 Ruby Dee, attended Hunter College; actor
 Denise Di Novi, graduate of Simmons College; Hollywood producer
 Nnenna Freelon, graduate of Simmons College; jazz vocalist
 Katharine Hepburn, 1928 graduate of Bryn Mawr College; actress
 Keshia Knight Pulliam, graduate of Spelman College; best known for her role as Rudy Huxtable on The Cosby Show
 Beth Leavel, graduate of Meredith College; Tony Award-winning actress
 Sally Mann, 1974 graduate of Hollins University; photographer
 Elizabeth Mitchell, graduate of Stephens College; television actress
 Diana Muldaur, 1960 graduate of Sweet Briar College; movie and TV actress; first woman president of the Academy of Television Arts & Sciences
 Jennifer Nettles, graduate of Agnes Scott College; lead singer of Grammy winning country band Sugarland
 Annie Potts, graduate of Stephens College; actress
 Mercedes Ruehl, 1969 graduate of The College of New Rochelle; Academy Award-winning stage and screen actress
 Meryl Streep, graduate of Vassar College; actress
 Ann Taylor, attended Sweet Briar College before transferring and graduating from the University of Tennessee; newscaster for National Public Radio (NPR)
 Twyla Tharp, 1963 graduate of Barnard College; figure in the world of dance
 Jennifer Tilly, graduate of Stephens College; Academy Award-nominated actress
 Suzanne Vega, graduate of Barnard College; musician
 Celia Weston, graduate of Salem College; actress; nominated for an Oscar for Dead Man Walking and a Tony for The Last Night of Ballyhoo
 Greta Gerwig, graduate of Barnard College; actress, writer, director, and producer; nominated for an Oscar for Lady Bird 
 Maggie Siff, graduate of Bryn Mawr College; actress

References

External links
 Women's College Coalition - list of alumnae
 "All women, and thriving" - News and Observer
 "In Virginia, three elite women's colleges reinvent themselves and find a new mission in a coed world" - 6 November 2006 Newsweek article on Sweet Briar College, Hollins University, and Mary Baldwin College
 "New study finds women’s colleges are better equipped to help their students" - Indiana University

 W
 United States
Alumnae
Lists of people by educational affiliation